Schinia bicuspida is a moth of the family Noctuidae. It is found in North America, including Arkansas, Arizona, Colorado, Kansas, Nebraska, New Mexico, Oklahoma, Texas and Utah.

The wingspan is about 23 mm.

The larvae feed on Isocoma drummondii and Machaeranthera annua.

External links
Images
Butterflies and Moths of North America
Species report

Schinia
Moths of North America
Moths described in 1891